The South Korea women's national field hockey team represents the Republic of Korea (South Korea).  The team has participated in every Summer Olympic Games since 1988 and have won silver twice: at the 1988 Seoul Summer Olympics and at the 1996 Atlanta Summer Olympics. They won the gold medal at the 1989 Women's Hockey Champions Trophy and the bronze medal at the 1990 Women's Hockey World Cup.

Results

Summer Olympics
1988 – 
1992 – 4th place
1996 – 
2000 – 9th place
2004 – 7th place
2008 – 9th place
2012 – 8th place
2016 – 11th place

World Cup
1990 – 
1994 – 5th place
1998 – 5th place
2002 – 6th place
2006 – 9th place
2010 – 6th place
2014 – 7th place
2018 – 12th place
2022 – 13th place

Asian Games
1982 – 
1986 – 
1990 – 
1994 – 
1998 – 
2002 – 
2006 – 4th place
2010 – 
2014 – 
2018 – 4th place
2022 – Qualified

Asia Cup
1985 – 
1989 – 
1993 – 
1999 – 
2004 – ''4th place
2007 – 
2009 – 
2013 – 
2017 – 
2022 –

Asian Champions Trophy
2010 – 
2011 – 
2016 – 4th place
2018 – 
2021 –

World League
2012–13 – 8th place
2014–15 – 8th place
2016–17 –

Hockey Nations Cup
 2022 – 6th place

Champions Trophy
1987 – 
1989 – 
1991 – 6th place
1993 – 4th place
1995 – 
1997 – 4th place
1999 – 6th place
2003 – 6th place
2005 – 6th place
2011 – 4th place
2012 – 7th place

Champions Challenge
2002 – 
2007 – 
2014 – 5th place

Current squad
Roster for the 2022 FIH Women's Hockey World Cup.

Head coach: Han Jin-su

References

External links

FIH profile

Field hockey
Asian women's national field hockey teams
National team